Omega (named Drumcliff until 1898) was a four-masted, steel-hulled barque built in Greenock, Scotland in 1887. In 1957 Omega became the last working cargo-carrying square-rigger afloat.  She carried oil, guano, nitrate, wheat, and other goods.  She sank in 1958, ending that age of sail.

History

Drumcliff was built at the shipyard of J. Russell & Co. in Greenock, Scotland, for Gillison & Chadwick, Liverpool, England. After her launching in 1887 she was placed under the command of Captain H. Davies.
On 28 July 1898, Drumcliff was sold to the Hamburger Reederei AG, which renamed her Omega. From 1898 until 1905 she sailed under Captain H. Krause, who was in command for her first great trip around the world. In 1898 she left the Lizard in the south of England for Adelaide, Australia. The following year she sailed to Newcastle, Australia, putting in at the Chilean harbours of Tocopilla and Iquique, before returning to the Lizard.

From 1906 until 1907 she sailed under Captain M. Ratzsch, followed by Captain A. Schellhas from 1908 until 1920. Under his command the ship also made long passages between Europe, South America (Pisagua and Tocopilla in Chile), Africa (Port Nolloth in South Africa) and Australia (Newcastle). From 1910 until 1912, under Captain G. Oellrich, she sailed to harbors on the West Coast of the US (San Diego, Portland, Oregon), in Europe (Hamburg, Rotterdam), Australia (Sydney, Newcastle), and South America (Chile). From 1913 until 1914 Captain P. Hammer assumed command.

During the First World War, the ship was interned in Peru. In 1918, she became a sail training ship.

In 1920, Omega was released to Peru as a war reparation, and in 1926 she was transferred to the guano firm Compañia Administradora del Guano in Callao, Peru. From then on, the ship was used to transport guano from outlying islands to the Peruvian mainland.

"The only commercial square-rigged sailing ships still operating anywhere in the world, in the year 1953, were the Peruvian guano barques: the three-masters Tellus and Maipo, and the four-master Omega'."

In 1957 Omega became the last. On 26 June 1958 she embarked on a voyage from the Pachamac Islands to Huacho, both in the Lima region along the Peruvian coast, with a load of 3,000 tons of guano. She sprang a leak and sank, ending her era of sail. Her captain, Juan Anibal Escobar Hurtado from Callao, was charged with sinking the ship and had his license suspended. In spite of paying divers to photograph the wreck in order to show that Omega sank due to age and poor maintenance, he was never cleared and died six years after the sinking, on 16 August 1964.

References and notes

Bibliography
 According to Bruzelius, there are discrepancies regarding the measurements of Drumcliff/Omega. 94.86 m × 13.15 m × 7.36 m (311'3 × 43'2 × 24'2 in feet), with another source indicating 90.96 m × 13.16 m ×7.47 m.
Ageofsail.net, Nov. 15, 2006

Further reading

External links

 Drumcliff, gelatin silver photograph, State Library of Victoria, Australia
 Omega, cover of Sea Breezes'', Christmas 1955

Barques
Windjammers
Individual sailing vessels
Sailing ships of the German Empire
Merchant ships of the German Empire
World War I merchant ships of the German Empire
Ships built on the River Clyde
Training ships
Four-masted ships
Guano trade
Ships of Peru
World War II merchant ships of Peru
Maritime incidents in 1958
1887 ships